The 2023 Cyprus Women's Cup was the 14th edition of the Cyprus Women's Cup, an international women's football tournament. It was held in Cyprus from 16 to 22 February 2023.

Finland won the title for the first time.

Format
The four invited teams played a round-robin tournament. Points awarded in the group stage followed the formula of three points for a win, one point for a draw, and zero points for a loss. A tie in points was decided by goal differential.

Venues

Teams

Squads

Standings

Results
All times are local (UTC+2).

Goalscorers

References

External links
Official website

2023 in women's association football
Cyprus Women's Cup
February 2023 sports events in Europe